Qaleh-ye Shamsi (also Romanized as Qal‘eh-ye Shamsī, Qal‘eh Shamshāh, Qal‘eh-ye Shamsā, and Qal‘eh-ye Shamshāh) is a village in Hemmatabad Rural District, in the Central District of Borujerd County, Lorestan Province, Iran. At the 2006 census, its population was 429, in 109 families.

References 

Towns and villages in Borujerd County